1st district Alabama House of Representatives, is one of 105 districts in the Alabama House of Representatives. Its current representative is Phillip Pettus. This District was created in 1966 and encompasses parts of Lauderdale County. It is still in use today.

Representatives

General Elections
Source: District 1 Races (1967-Present)

References

01
1967 establishments in Alabama